Path Bendhe Dilo was a Bengali drama film directed by Premendra Mitra based on his own novel. This film was released in 1945 under the banner of Deluxe Pictures.

Plot

Cast
 Chhabi Biswas
 Kanan Devi 
 Tulsi Chakraborty
 Jahar Ganguly
 Jiben Bose
 Shyam Laha
 Purnima Devi
 Krishnadhan Mukherjee
 Prabha Devi
 Rabi Ray
 Ranjit Roy

References

External links
 

1945 films
Bengali-language Indian films
Indian drama films
Films based on Indian novels
Films directed by Premendra Mitra
1945 drama films
Indian black-and-white films
1940s Bengali-language films